The Maguindanao Provincial Board was the Sangguniang Panlalawigan (provincial legislature) of the Philippine province of Maguindanao.

The members were elected via plurality-at-large voting: the province was divided into two districts, each having five seats. A voter voted up to five names, with the top five candidates per district being elected. The vice governor was the ex officio presiding officer, and only voted to break ties. The vice governor was elected via the plurality voting system province-wide.

The districts used in appropriation of members were coextensive with the legislative districts of Maguindanao., with the exception that Cotabato City, an independent component city, was excluded in the first district.

Aside from the regular members, the board also included the provincial federation presidents of the Liga ng mga Barangay (ABC, from its old name "Association of Barangay Captains"), the Sangguniang Kabataan (SK, youth councils) and the Philippine Councilors League (PCL). Maguindanao's provincial board also had a reserved seat for its indigenous people (IPMR).

The board was disbanded when Maguindanao divided itself into two provinces on September 18, 2022, after a successful plebiscite yesterday. A transition period took place, which lasted until January 9, 2023.

Apportionment

List of members

Final members 
These were the members after the 2022 local elections:

 Vice Governor: Bai Ainee Sinsuat (Nacionalista)

References 

Provincial boards in the Philippines
Historical legislatures in the Philippines